Galvez – Imperador do Acre (Galvez - The Emperor of Acre) is a book published in 1976 by Brazilian author Márcio Souza (born 1946) about an episode in the history of Acre State (Brazil). This short novel mixes the historical novel and feuilleton styles. The book was a great success in the eighties.

Synopsis

Background

In 1899, the borders between Bolivia and Brazil were not clearly defined. At the time, the people living in the Amazon Basin were rich due to the natural resource of latex. The best rubber is produced in Acre, a region that, although inhabited by Brazilians, is theoretically part of the Republic of Bolivia.

Luis Gálvez Rodríguez de Arias was a Spanish journalist in Belém do Pará who on June 3, 1899 denounced a claimed agreement between United States and Bolivia that stated that the United States would support Bolivia in a possible war against Brazil. This became a scandal, but the Bolivian and North American authorities denied the accusation.

Galvez, with the financial support of the Amazonas government, went to Acre and, on July 14, 1899, the Independent State of Acre was declared. He declared himself president. On December 28, 1899, Galvez was deposed by Antônio de Sousa Braga, but he was restored on January 30, 1900, by Braga himself.

On March 15, 1900, a military expedition by the Brazilian Navy took the Acre region back from Bolivia.

The Novel
In the book, Galvez is an adventurer without scruples, working as a journalist in Belém. The novel starts when Galvez falls from a window, running away from a lady's husband, and, accidentally, saves the life of Luiz Trucco, the consul of Bolivia.

Invited by the diplomat, he goes to a party, where he meets Cira, a woman interested in the Acre question. Cira asks him to steal the USA-Bolivian agreement. Trucco, who trusts Galvez, gives it to him to have it translated. Denouncing the agreement to the Belém press, the journalist has to escape.
In the city harbour, he hides himself in a departing ship in the Amazon River, heading to Manaus. The passengers are a group of nuns. He seduces one of them, Joana, and afterwards they are abandoned in a bank of the Amazon River. He is rescued by the ship of Sir Henry, an English metaphysical scientist who thinks the Amazon Theatre is a spaceship, and Justine L'Amour and Blangis are Opera artists and part of the trouppe Les Comédiens Tropicales.
Some weeks later, he and Les Comédiens go to the Bolivian city of Puerto Alonso, Acre, in a ship, where Trucco and the neurotic consul of United States are traveling. Galvez gets on the ship, hidden in a coffin.
In Puerto Alonso he meets the local big shot and amasses money and an army. On July 14 he takes over Puerto Alonso without a fight. The Great Battle of the Independence of Acre is a trouble in the city-centre.
He declares himself Emperor. The old and tedious Acre become the lascivious Empire of Acre (fictional: the author says in the book that Galvez, the narrator is lying). During the new year celebrations, Galvez is deposed and Joana dies.

Adaptations
A graphic novel adaptation in Portuguese was made by Miguel Lalor (pencil/color) and Andrei Miralha (ink/color) in 2004, as a limited edition by the Government of Para/Brazil (Secult/PA).

1976 novels
Brazilian historical novels
Acre (state)